Ahmad Sanjari (born 22 February 1960 in Karaj) is a retired Iranian professional footballer who represented Iran in the 1978 FIFA World Cup. He first played for Indian club Mohammedan S.C. during 1978 at the age of 18. He was the head coach of Mes Sarcheshmeh from 2009 to 2011 and promoted to the team to the Iran Pro League in 2011 but was fired after four weeks because of poor results in premier league.

Personal life
Sanjari was born in 1960 in Karaj and came to India to study. He was a student of Aligarh Muslim University during the late 1970s.

Club career
Sanjari began his professional career with Calcutta-giant Mohammedan Sporting in 1978. He played only a single season for the club in the Calcutta Football League and achieved local popularity.

After his stint with Mohammedan, Sanjari moved to Iran and played for Tehran Province League side Homa F.C. from 1979 to 1988.

International career
Sanjari was a regular member of the Iran national football team from 1978 to 1984. He has also represented Iran in the 1984 AFC Asian Cup.

Managerial career
Sanjari began his coaching career in India with National Football League side Dempo SC. He took charge of the Goan-side in 2000 when Dempo relegated to the 2nd division. He kept faith in youngsters and was the man who transformed Samir Naik from a striker to one of India's most enterprising full-back.

He became the assistant manager and later head-coach of Iranian side Mes Sarcheshmeh from 2007 to 2011. From 2012 to 2013, he was on charge of F.C. Iranjavan Bushehr and in 2013 of Rahian Kermanshah F.C.

Managerial statistics

See also
 Iranian international footballers
 List of 1984 AFC Asian Cup players
 Homa F.C. players

References

Living people
1960 births
Iranian football managers
People from Karaj
Homa F.C. players
Iran international footballers
Iranian footballers
1980 AFC Asian Cup players
1984 AFC Asian Cup players
Association football defenders
Expatriate footballers in India
Mohammedan SC (Kolkata) players
Iranian expatriate sportspeople in India
Calcutta Football League players